Apple Orchard Point Island is a small island, with an area of 0.85 ha, in south-eastern Australia.  It is part of Tasmania’s Vansittart Island Group, lying in eastern Bass Strait between Flinders and Cape Barren Islands in the Furneaux Group.

Fauna
Recorded breeding seabird and wader species are little penguin and sooty oystercatcher.  Reptiles present include white-lipped snake and metallic skink.

References

Furneaux Group